The Property Law of the People's Republic of China is a property law adopted by the National People's Congress in 2007 (on March 16) that went into effect on October 1, 2007. The law covers the creation, transfer, and ownership of property in the mainland of the People's Republic of China (PRC) and is part of an ongoing effort by the PRC to gradually develop a civil code. it contains all aspects of property law in the PRC's legal system.

The law was drafted quite differently from the usual legislative process in the PRC where laws are drafted behind closed doors, over 14 000 public submissions were considered for over a decade before the law was adopted and put into effect.

In developing civil law in the PRC mainland, the PRC government has used the German Pandectist system of classification under which the property law corresponds to the law on real rights, which is the term used in Chinese for the official name of the law.

Passage
The drafting of the law involved considerable controversy. The proposed bill caused quite a stir since it was first published in 2002, was subsequently deferred, and yet again failed in its reading at the National People's Congress (NPC) of 2006 because of disputes over its content.  It finally went through its eighth reading in 2007.

Many in the Chinese legal community feared that creating a single law to cover both state property and private property would facilitate privatization and asset stripping of state-owned enterprises. The draft law was subject to a constitutional challenge. Legal scholars, notably Gong Xiantian of Peking University, argued that it violated the constitutional characterization of the PRC as a socialist state. The law was originally scheduled to be adopted in 2005, but was removed from the legislative agenda following these objections. The final form of the law contains a number of additions to address these objections.

On March 8, 2007, the Property Law was formally introduced at the NPC. Vice-Chairman Wang Zhaoguo told the Congress that the law will "safeguard the fundamental interests of the people", and the law is an attempt at adapting to new "economic and social realities" in China.

The law was adopted on March 16, the final day of the two-week session of congress, with the backing of 96.9% of the 2,889 legislators attending, with 2799 for, 52 against, and 37 abstentions. In his final address to the 2007 Session, NPC Chairman Wu Bangguo declared "the Private Property Law and the Corporate Taxation law are two of the most important laws in the new economic system of Socialism with Chinese characteristics, we must attempt to learn these laws fully through various methods."

Description
The Property Law contains 5 parts, 19 chapters and 247 articles. The parts deal with the following topics:

Part One - General Provisions

Part Two - Ownership

Part Three - Usufructs

Part Four - Security Interest in Property

Part Five - Possession.

The main purpose of the law is stated in Article 1. "This Law is enacted in accordance with the Constitution for the purpose of upholding the basic economic system of the State, maintaining the order of the socialist market economy, defining the attribution of things, giving play to the usefulness of things and protecting the property right of obligees."

Article 9 states, "The creation, alteration, transfer or extinction of the property right shall become valid upon registration according to law; otherwise it shall not become valid, unless otherwise provided for by law. Registration of ownership of all the natural resources which are owned by the State in accordance with law may be dispensed with."

The law covers all of the three property types within the People's Republic of China, which are state, collective, and private which are defined in Chapter 5 of the law.  Chapter 4, Article 40 of the law divides property rights into three types: ownership rights, use rights, and security rights.  The law goes into detail about the legal rights associated with any of these three types.

The law does not change the system of land tenure by which the state owns all land.  However, in formalizing existing practice, individuals can possess a land-use right, which is defined in Chapter 10 of the law.  The law defines this land-use right in terms of the civil law concept of usufruct.

Response
Some press reports have characterized this law as the first piece of legislation in the People's Republic of China to cover an individual's right to own private assets, although this is incorrect as the right to private property was written into the Constitution of the People's Republic of China in 2004. The amendment states "Citizens' lawful private property is inviolable."

See also 
 Chinese property law
 Intellectual property in the People's Republic of China
 Nail houses
 land reform

Notes

References

External links 
An English translation of the Property Law of the PRC on the NPC's official website
English translation, Lehman, Lee & Xu, LLP
 Text in Chinese
 Draft text in Chinese
 China Introduces Landmark Property Law, Guardian Unlimited
 China passes new law on property, BBC, Friday, 16 March 2007, 02:51 GMT.

Property law of China